Horsham Cricket Club is one of the oldest cricket clubs in the world and represents the Sussex market town of Horsham in the Sussex Cricket League, along with Roffey Cricket Club.

Although cricket was played in Horsham before 1768, the first recorded game of a town side was on 8 August 1771, and Horsham Cricket Club was created soon after 1806. The club has played various locations over the years, before settling at their present ground in 1851.

Cricketfield Road

Horsham is on 'Cricketfield Road' and the Ground is known as the Cricketfield Road Ground. This ground is the only ground to host both the MCC Spirit of Cricket U13 Regional Finals and the Portman Cup U15 Regional Finals. The two ends are called the Town End and the Railway End. Horsham's second ground is named after former President Dr. John Dew, which lies adjacent to the main square.

First XI

Horsham is a very successful club which has played home to many first class cricketers. It runs four Saturday men's teams, one Sunday men's and two women's teams. Arguably one of the strongest club sides in the south, Horsham have won the Sussex League title a record eight times and the Cyril Snell trophy a record 11 times (including six times in seven years between 2001 and 2006); most recently in August 2010 where Horsham beat Stirlands CC to win a tight match by four runs, with two balls remaining. The club's crowning achievement came in 2005 when they won the Cockspur Cup for the first time in their history. They were captained to victory by Luke Marshall in a tight thriller against Barnt Green of Birmingham, in which Marshall bowled Horsham to victory by three runs off the final ball, in which Chris Nash was Man of the Match.

Sussex CCC

Horsham CC annually hosts a week of cricket for Sussex County Cricket Club, being one of three official Sussex outgrounds. A first-class match and a domestic limited overs match is usually part of the week, known as the Horsham Cricket Festival.

Notable Horsham cricketers

Players with first-class caps who have represented Horsham are:

  Jofra Archer
  Will Beer
  Shaun Humphries
  Andrew Hodd
  Carl Hopkinson
  Will House
  Robin Martin-Jenkins
  Roger Marshall
  Chris Nash
  Michael Thornely
  Michael Munday
  David Hussey
  Shane Jurgensen
  Matt Henry
  Jan-Berrie Burger
  Naved Arif Gondal
  Mark Sanders
  Kamau Leverock
 In the 1980s, Australian cricketer Tim May spent a season honing his offspin as a 19-year-old.
 In the 1970s Sussex and England cricketer, Paul Parker, lived and went to school in the town after his family arrived in the UK from Rhodesia.

References

External links
 Horsham CC website
 Horsham CC fixtures
 Horsham hold nerve to lift Cup

Cricket in West Sussex
English club cricket teams
Cricket grounds in West Sussex
Sports venues completed in 1851
1851 establishments in England